In mathematics, more specifically in geometric topology, the Kirby–Siebenmann class is an obstruction for topological manifolds to allow a PL-structure.

The KS-class
For a topological manifold M, the Kirby–Siebenmann class  is an element of the fourth cohomology group of M that vanishes if M admits a piecewise linear structure. 

It is the only such obstruction, which can be phrased as the weak equivalence  of TOP/PL with an Eilenberg–MacLane space. 

The Kirby-Siebenmann class can be used to prove the existence of topological manifolds that do not admit a PL-structure.

The class is named after Robion Kirby and Larry Siebenmann, who developed the theory of topological and PL-manifolds.

See also
Hauptvermutung

References

Homology theory
Geometric topology
Structures on manifolds
Surgery theory